Events in the year 1913 in Belgium.

Incumbents
Monarch: Albert I
Prime Minister: Charles de Broqueville

Events

April
 14 April – Socialists call general strike demanding electoral reform.
 22 April – General strike ends
 26 April – King Albert formally opens Exposition universelle et internationale (world's fair) held in Ghent.

November
 3 November – Exposition universelle et internationale (world's fair) in Ghent ends.

December
 10 December – Nobel Peace Prize awarded to Henri La Fontaine, head of the International Peace Bureau.

Publications
 Biographie Nationale de Belgique, vol. 21.
 G. A. Boulenger, The Snakes of Europe (London, Methuen).

Births
 17 January – Werenfried van Straaten, priest (died 2003)
 21 August – François Devries, footballer (died 1972)
 15 November – Arthur Haulot, journalist (died 2005)
 3 December – Omer Vanaudenhove, politician (died 1994)

Deaths
 29 January – Joseph Van den Gheyn (born 1854), librarian
 13 June – Camille Lemonnier (born 1844), writer
 13 August – Hildebrand de Hemptinne (born 1849), abbot
 9 September – Paul de Smet de Naeyer (born 1843), former prime minister

References

 
1910s in Belgium